The National Changhua Girls’ Senior High School (CHGSH), founded in April 1919, is a high school in Changhua City, Changhua County, Taiwan. There are 45 classes with 1,900 students and 140 faculty members.

Principals of the school

Japanese Colonial Period
Since 1919, six Japanese were assigned as principals of the school.

Since World War II
Since 1945, the school has been led by fourteen principals and all of them have been women, except the present principal, Kong Jian-Kuo.

Chou Ze Lan (丑澤蘭 December 1945~May 1946)
Huang Jun (黃  濬 June 1946~February 1947)
Huang Fu Gui (皇甫珪 March 1947~June 1950)
Lin Shi Ge (林詩閣 July 1950~August 1950)
Fu Xiao Fong (傅曉峰 August 1950~January 1953)
Wu Zi Wo (吳子我 February 1953~February 1956)
Huang Dong Sheng (黃東生 February 1956~June 1957)
Ye Shu Ren (葉淑仁 June 1957~June 1959)
Shen Ya Li (沈雅利 June 1959~August 1966)
Jing Sheng Ran (景生然 August 1966~September 1968)
Bu Qing Kui (卜慶葵 September 1968~August 1979)
Xie Yu Ying (謝玉英 August 1979~January 1992)
He Yu Qing (賀玉琴 February 1992~January 1998)
Chen Yue Qiong (陳月瓊 February 1998~January 2000)
Xiao Hui Lan (蕭惠蘭 February 2000~July 2004)
Kong Jian-Kuo (孔建國 August 2004~July 2012)
Cheng Yao-Chung Ph.D.(鄭曜忠 August 2012~present)

Information
The school has had many names, becoming the National Changhua Girls' Senior High School in 2000.
To promote the creed of "learning in serving," students, teachers, alumnae and parents are encouraged to do volunteer services.
School clubs include a marching band and honor guard clubs. School has speech contestants in Chinese, English, and Taiwanese who attend speech contests.
The school's foreign language courses are taught by foreign teachers. Educational tours to Japan are held every year.
The school's alumnae are scattered throughout Taiwan and overseas, and there is an alumnae association.

Facilities
The school boasts a natural environment with green trees. The school makes efforts to plant vegetation and beautify the campus. There are "Blackies" (Malay night herons) on the campus.
The school was chosen as the model school of environmental protection by Taiwan's Department of Environmental Protection.
The school has a library with a Video On Demand (VOD) system, set up to facilitate students’ learning at any time and to provide special programs as well as movies every month.
The school dormitory can accommodate 500 students.

Annual events

October
 College visits for the second graders
 Target practice for the second graders in Cheng-Kung Hill
 The performance of school band and honor guards in Double Ten Day

December
 Anniversary celebrations and sports meet

January
 Year-end banquet

May
 School Carnival, held biennially

June
 The exhibition of students’ clubs
 Graduation

Visits to and from Japan

2004
In May, 71 teachers and students visited Hashimoto High School in Wakayama Prefecture and Prefectural Shingu Senior High School in the Fukuoka Prefecture.

2005
In January, the Director of Education Committee of Japan, visited Changhwa Girls’ Senior High.
In May, 114 teachers and students from the school visited Himeji Nishi Senior High School in Hyōgo Prefecture and Osaka Prefectural Kitano High School.
In August, ten staff who were principal, teachers, and students' parents visited Changhwa.
For five days in September, principal Kong went to Japan for the Educational Communication Conference. On September 9, principal Kong visited Matsumoto Agatagaoka high school in Nagano Prefecture.

2006
In May, 155 teachers and students visited the Director of Education Committee of Japan and Prefectural Shingu Senior High School and Seishoukai High School.

2007
In May, 153 teachers and students visited Himeji Nishi Senior High School in Hyōgo Prefecture.
In December, two officials from Japan National Tourism Organization and one official of Educational Bureau visited.

2008
In May, an official from Japan National Tourism Organization's publicity department came to visit. That same month, 190 teachers and students visited Hashimoto High School and Prefectural Shingu Senior High School.

Notable alumni
 Liu Ts'ui-jung, historian

See also
 Education in Taiwan

1919 establishments in Taiwan
Buildings and structures in Changhua County
Changhua City
Educational institutions established in 1919
Education in Changhua County
High schools in Taiwan